Petros Konnafis (born August 28, 1979) is a Cypriot former football defender who played for Apollon Limassol. His former teams are AC Omonia, Anorthosis Famagusta and KAA Gent. Konnafis was played many friendly games with Aris Thessaloniki on 1999, but AC Omonia blocked his transfer to Aris. He also briefly signed with Olympiakos Nicosia in 2009, but after training realised that he cannot continue playing competitively and decided to retire due to an old injury. Now he is a football agent.

His all time highest market value was 200,000 euros.

External links
 

1979 births
Living people
Cypriot footballers
Cyprus international footballers
AC Omonia players
Anorthosis Famagusta F.C. players
Apollon Limassol FC players
K.A.A. Gent players
Association football defenders